Unfinished Business is a 1985 documentary film directed by Steven Okazaki which centers on Min Yasui, an attorney from Oregon, Gordon Hirabayashi, a Quaker college student in Washington, and Fred Korematsu, a San Francisco welder and how their lives were affected by Japanese American internment during World War II.

The film was nominated for the Academy Award for Best Documentary Feature for 1986.

References

External links

Unfinished Business at Farallon Films

1985 films
American black-and-white films
American documentary films
Films directed by Steven Okazaki
Documentary films about the internment of Japanese Americans
1985 documentary films
1980s English-language films
1980s American films